Matteo Berrettini and Daniele Bracciali were the defending champions, but chose not to participate this year.

Sander Gillé and Joran Vliegen won the title, defeating Philipp Oswald and Filip Polášek in the final, 6–4, 6–3.

Seeds

Draw

Draw

References

External links
 Main Draw

Swiss Open Gstaad - Doubles
2019 Doubles